The Great Smith House Hustle is a novel for children by the American writer Jane Louise Curry.

The Smith clan, who after moving across the country to live in Grandma Smith’s old house in Pittsburgh, Pennsylvania, learn they are to be evicted. The Smith children, with the help of the community, race to uncover a long-standing scam to steal the houses of seniors before the savings and loan bank repossesses Grandma’s home.

References

1993 American novels
1993 children's books
American children's novels
Novels set in Pittsburgh